Guillermo Coria defeated Rainer Schüttler in the final, 6–2, 6–1, 6–3 to win the singles tennis title at the 2004 Monte Carlo Masters.

Juan Carlos Ferrero was the two-time defending champion, but lost in the first round to Àlex Corretja.

Seeds

  Andy Roddick (withdrew)
  Juan Carlos Ferrero (first round)
  Guillermo Coria (champion)
  Rainer Schüttler (final)
  Carlos Moyá (semifinals)
  Tim Henman (quarterfinals)
  David Nalbandian (quarterfinals)
  Sébastien Grosjean (second round)
  Nicolás Massú (third round)
  Paradorn Srichaphan (first round)
  Sjeng Schalken (first round)
  Jiří Novák (first round)
  Fernando González (first round)
  Martin Verkerk (second round)
  Mardy Fish (withdrew)
  Lleyton Hewitt (third round)

Draw

Finals

Top half

Section 1

Section 2

Bottom half

Section 3

Section 4

External links
 Main draw

2004 Monte Carlo Masters
Singles